The March Hare is a 1919 British silent comedy film directed by Frank Miller and starring Godfrey Tearle, Ivy Duke and Will Corrie. The screenplay was written by Guy Newall as a vehicle for his wife Ivy Duke.

Cast
 Godfrey Tearle as Guy
 Ivy Duke as Ivy
 Will Corrie
 Philip Hewland
 Lewis Gilbert
 Douglas Heathcote
 Percy Crawford 
 Peggy Maurice
 John Miller

References

Bibliography
 Bamford, Kentom. Distorted Images: British National Identity and Film in the 1920s. I.B. Tauris, 1999.
 Low, Rachael. History of the British Film, 1918-1929. George Allen & Unwin, 1971.

1919 films
1919 comedy films
British comedy films
British silent feature films
British black-and-white films
Films directed by Frank Miller (screenwriter)
1910s English-language films
1910s British films
Silent comedy films